Kapampangan, Capampañgan or Pampangan may refer to:

Kapampangan people, of the Philippines
Kapampangan language, their Austronesian language

Language and nationality disambiguation pages